The England women's under-19 cricket team represents England and Wales in international under-19 women's cricket. The team is administrated by the England and Wales Cricket Board (ECB).

The team played their first official matches at the 2023 ICC Under-19 Women's T20 World Cup, the first ever international women's under-19 cricket competition, in which they reached the final, where they lost to India.

History
Since 2000, English Under-19 cricket teams have been formed to play matches against other national age-group and development teams. These matches carried no formal ICC designation.

The inaugural Women's Under-19 World Cup was scheduled to take place in January 2021, but was postponed multiple times due to the COVID-19 pandemic. The tournament was eventually scheduled to take place in 2023, in South Africa. As a Full Member of the ICC, England qualified automatically for the tournament.

England announced their 15-player squad for the tournament on 18 October 2022. Chris Guest, Head Coach of The Blaze, was chosen as Head Coach of the side for the tournament, assisted by Laura Marsh and Darren Franklin. Grace Scrivens was later named as captain of the side. The side went unbeaten throughout the tournament to reach the final, but lost to India in the final by 7 wickets. England captain Grace Scrivens was named Player of the Tournament.

Recent call-ups
The table below lists all the players who have been selected in recent squads for England under-19s. Currently, this only includes the squad for the 2023 ICC Under-19 Women's T20 World Cup.

Records & Statistics

Leading runs scorers

Leading wickets takers

Highest individual innings

Best individual bowling figures

Highest team totals

Lowest team totals

Under-19 World Cup record

References

Women's Under-19 cricket teams
C
C
England in international cricket
Wales in international cricket